Päivi Anneli Salo (born 31 January 1974) is a Finnish retired ice hockey player. She played 73 matches with the Finnish national team, including in the women's tournament at the 1998 Winter Olympics, where she won a bronze medal, and in the women's tournament at the 2002 Winter Olympics. She also competed at the 1997 IIHF World Championship, where she won a bronze medal with the Finnish national team, and at the 2001 IIHF Women's Championship, where Finland placed fourth.

In Finland, Salo played the entirety of her club career with Oulun Kärpät Naiset of the Naisten SM-sarja, winning four Finnish Championship (SM) silver medals and one SM bronze medal.

References

External links

1974 births
Living people
People from Orimattila
Finnish women's ice hockey defencemen
Oulun Kärpät Naiset players
Ice hockey players at the 1998 Winter Olympics
Ice hockey players at the 2002 Winter Olympics
Medalists at the 1998 Winter Olympics
Olympic bronze medalists for Finland
Olympic ice hockey players of Finland
Olympic medalists in ice hockey
Sportspeople from Päijät-Häme